Eneida Marta is a singer from Guinea-Bissau who sings in Portuguese and Guinea-Bissau Creole. Three of her albums have been released since 2001 — Nô Stória (2001), Amari (2002), and Lôpe Kaï (2006).

References

External links
 Eneida Marta at myspace.com

West African music
Bissau-Guinean musicians
Living people
Year of birth missing (living people)